Vepryk is a selo in Ukraine, in Fastiv Raion of Kyiv Oblast. It belongs to Fastiv urban hromada, one of the hromadas of Ukraine. 
The village has a population of 1,053. It is famous for being the place where Ukrainian composer Kyrylo Stetsenko died. His house is a currently a museum, and there is monument on his grave.

References

Villages in Fastiv Raion